Jill Ethel Eggleton  is a New Zealand children's book author, teacher and education consultant. She received the Margaret Mahy Award in 2015 for Everyone Has A Story. Eggleton has authored over 800 children's books; in 2009 alone she wrote 60 books. She was appointed Companion of the Queen's Service Order (QSO) in the 2010 New Year Honours "for services to education and literacy". Eggleton lives in Parnell, Auckland.

Publications 
Eggleton's many books for children include:

 Mrs Pye's Pool, Sunshine Multimedia (Australia) Pty Ltd, Thomastown, Victoria, 2015
 Big Bubba, Global Education Systems Ltd, Auckland, New Zealand, 2016
 Silly Billy, Global Education Systems Ltd, Auckland, New Zealand, 2015
 A New Bed, Sunshine Multimedia (Australia) Pty Ltd, Thomastown, Victoria, 2015
 Wake UP Cow, Global Education Systems Ltd, Auckland, New Zealand, 2015

References

External links 
 

Year of birth missing (living people)
21st-century New Zealand women writers
Companions of the Queen's Service Order
People from Auckland
Living people
New Zealand women children's writers